Rui Neves may refer to:

 Rui Neves (footballer, born 1965), Portuguese football player, forward
 Rui Neves (footballer, born 1969), Portuguese football player, defender
 Rui Neves (footballer, born 1997), Portuguese football player, goalkeeper